Union sportive de la médina d'Alger is an Algerian professional football club based in Algiers, Algiers Province. The club was formed in Casbah in 1937 as Union Sportive Musulmane d'Alger, and played their first competitive match in 1937, when they entered the 1937–38 Ligue d'Alger Troisième Division. The club was renamed Union sportive de la médina d'Alger in 1989.

The club has won a total of 18 major trophies, including the national championship 7 times also won the Algerian Cup a record 8 times, the Algerian Super Cup 1 time, and the UAFA Club Cup 1 time Al Ittihad reached the CAF Champions League final for the first time in 2015 but was defeated against TP Mazembe. The club has also never been out of the top two divisions of Algerian football since entering the Football League.

This is a list of the seasons played by USM Alger from 1962 when the club first entered a league competition to the most recent seasons. The club's achievements in all major national and international competitions as well as the top scorers are listed. Top scorers in bold were also top scorers of Ligue 1. The list is separated into three parts, coinciding with the three major episodes of Algerian football:

History 
The club formed in 1937 as Union Sportive Musulmane d'Alger after considerable difficulties because of the designation of the Musulmane, where the French administration requested to remove the word however it was the first season in the third division 1937–38 season the results of the team during the colonial period are not in the table and the competitions in which he was then participating are Ligue d'Alger, Coupe de la Ligue and Coupe de la Solidarité The USMA has never participated in a continental competition at the time like North African Championship and North African Cup.

After independence, Al Ittihad became the first champion of Algeria after winning the final match against MC Alger 3–0, it also has the record of reaching the final of the Algerian Cup 17 times, won eight of them also considered the most losing team for the final nine times, including five consecutive times from 1969 to 1973 it is the first club to win the Cup of Algeria and play in second division in 1981 also the only one who won the championship immediately after his second division rise in the 1995–96 season, in 2002–03, they won an unprecedented Doubles of Ligue 1, Algerian Cup in 2001–02 and 2002–03, making USM Alger only the fourth club to win two consecutive Algerian league titles knowing there is no Algerian club won the Algerian league three consecutive times or more. The USMA is a party to the first Super Cup final in 1981, which they were defeated against RC Kouba 3–1 this tournament later achieved twice, in 2013 and 2016. In 1982, USM Alger he debuted for the first time in African competition, entering the Cup Winners' Cup also in 1997, became the first Algerian club to enter Champions League in its new version.

Seasons

Before independence
Below, the USM Alger season-by-season record before independence in the French Algeria period :

After independence
Below, the USM Alger season-by-season record after independence of Algeria :

Key 

Key to league record:
P = Played
W = Games won
D = Games drawn
L = Games lost
GF = Goals for
GA = Goals against
Pts = Points
Pos = Final position

Key to divisions:
1 = Ligue 1
2 = Ligue 2

Key to rounds:
DNE = Did not enter
NP = Not played
PR = Preliminary round
Grp = Group stage
R1 = First Round
R2 = Second Round
PO = Play-off round

R32 = Round of 32
R16 = Round of 16
QF = Quarter-finals
SF = Semi-finals
RU = Runners-up
W = Winners

Division shown in bold to indicate a change in division.
Top scorers shown in bold are players who were also top scorers in their division that season.

Notes

References 

Seasons
 
USM Alger